is a professional Japanese baseball player. He plays pitcher for the Chunichi Dragons.

On 17 October 2019, Okano was selected as the 3rd draft pick for the Chunichi Dragons at the 2019 NPB Draft and on 20 November signed a provisional contract with a ¥70,000,000 sign-on bonus and a ¥12,000,000 yearly salary. He was presented the number 36 previously vacated by Ryota Ishioka.

References

External links
Japan Baseball

1994 births
Living people
People from Ishinomaki
Baseball people from Miyagi Prefecture
Japanese baseball players
Nippon Professional Baseball pitchers
Chunichi Dragons players